Tom or Thomas Croft may refer to:

Sports
 Thomas Croft Buck (born 1970), Danish lightweight rower
 Tom Croft (born 1985), English rugby union player
 Thomas "Tucker" Croft (died 1955), Irish footballer

Others
 Thomas Croft (MP) for Ludlow (UK Parliament constituency)
 Tommy Croft, comedian in Jollyboat (comedy act)
 Sir Thomas Elmsley Croft, 7th Baronet (1798–1835), of the Croft baronets
 Sir Thomas Stephen Hutton Croft, 6th Baronet (born 1959), of the Croft baronets

See also
 Thomas Crofts, British bibliophile, Anglican priest, Fellow of the Royal Society and European traveller